Vexillum strnadi is a species of sea snail, a marine gastropod mollusk in the family Costellariidae.

Original description
     Poppe G. & Tagaro S. (2010) New species of Haloceratidae, Columbellidae, Buccinidae, Mitridae, Costellariidae, Amathinidae and Spondylidae from the Philippines. Visaya 3(1):73-93.

References

External links
 Worms Link

strnadi
Gastropods described in 2010